1986–87 San Diego Toreros men's basketball team represented University of San Diego during the 1986–87 men's college basketball season. The Toreros were led by head coach Hank Egan and played their home games at USD Sports Center. After winning the regular season conference title, they received an at-large bid to the NCAA tournament where they lost in the first round to Auburn.

Roster

Schedule and results

|-
!colspan=9 style=| Regular season

|-
!colspan=9 style=| West Cost Conference tournament

|-
!colspan=9 style=| NCAA tournament

Awards and honors 
Scott Thompson – WCAC Player of the Year
Hank Egan – WCAC Coach of the Year

References 

San Diego
San Diego Toreros men's basketball seasons
San Diego
San Diego Toreros men's basketball
San Diego Toreros men's basketball